The Shifnal Festival was an annual Music, Arts and Culture Festival held in the market town of Shifnal, Shropshire.

History
Little is known about the origins of the festival. A book published in 1904 by Harold Sadler suggests the festival was a local event held in the grounds of Aston Hall to the east of the town. Aston Hall was at the time owned by Colonel Howard-McClean. Sadler's book marks the festival as being The Hadley Orpheus Choir's first competitive success.

Revival
Research carried out as part of the Shifnal Town Plan in 2008 suggested residents of the town were interested in staging a festival of arts, culture and entertainment. A committee was formed of volunteers and a date was announced for the first modern Shifnal festival in September 2010. The committee secured funding from the town council and applied for a series of grants from a number of sources.

The Shifnal Festival should not be confused with V Festival, a music festival that was held until 2017 at the nearby Weston Park (although the Weston Park address is classed as "Nr Shifnal").

Format

The festival aimed itself at all age groups and claimed to provide something for everyone. Typically incorporated into the programme were:
Live Music.
An art exhibition which featured pieces my local artists. A theme was often given for the pieces to conform to.
A photographic exhibition, which was often themed and formed part of a competition.
A form of drama or performing arts show.
Dance workshops or classes.
Craft workshops and fairs.
A spirituality element such as choral singing or religion based art.
Spoken word and poetry events.
A Film event.
A family fun day.
Fringe events organised by local businesses and groups.

Awards
In 2010 the Festival was Commended by the Action for Market Town Awards. The award is displayed on the Festival's website

Festivals

2010 Festival

17–26 September 2010.

2011 Festival
13–25 September 2011.

2012 Festival

4–7 October 2012.
The 2012 festival took on a victoriana theme and included a vintage fair.
At the close of the festival, the organising committee disbanded due to lack of funding to continue with the annual running of the festival.

References

Festivals in Shropshire
Shifnal